Gramella gaetbulicola is a Gram-negative, aerobic and rod-shaped bacterium from the genus of Gramella which has been isolated from foreshore soil.

References

Flavobacteria
Bacteria described in 2011